Eugenia terpnophylla is a species of plant in the family Myrtaceae. It is endemic to Sri Lanka.

References

Endemic flora of Sri Lanka
terpnophylla
Endangered plants
Taxonomy articles created by Polbot